An oatmeal cookie is an alcoholic drink named for its taste, which is reportedly similar to an oatmeal cookie. It can be served either layered or mixed, depending on the bartender. Ingredients vary, but a sample recipe is equal parts Irish cream, Goldschläger, and butterscotch schnapps.

An alternate recipe is to use equal parts Irish cream, butterscotch schnapps, Jägermeister, and Kahlúa. Another is to use three parts Irish cream, three parts butterscotch schnapps, one part Jägermeister, and one part cinnamon schnapps.

References

 The Joy of Mixology: The Consummate Guide to the Bartender's Craft – Gary Regan – Google Books
 Beer Cocktails: 50 Superbly Crafted Cocktails That Liven Up Your Lagers and Ales - Howard Stelzer, Ashley Stelzer - Google Books

Cocktails with liqueur
Cocktails with coffee liqueur
Cocktails with Irish cream